Masséda is a town in South East Togo. The area was formerly known as Masseville.

It is notable as it is the home of the US Masséda football club.

References

External links 
Masseda at Tageo.com

Populated places in Maritime Region